Rashad Mohammed Thabet Murad (born 1970), Syrian Arabic dentist, was born in Riyadh in a well-known Damascene family. He lived in Syria and graduated from Ibn Khaldon high school in 1987, and joined Al-Ba’th Faculty of Dentistry University. He graduated and obtained a seventh rank in 1992. Mentioned here is his several certificates in: Dentistry, Pharmacy, Management, Public Health, Pharmacology, Dental Implants.
On 12 May 2015 the ICOI appointed him as an international president for ICOI representing their interest in Syria.

Patent
Murad holds a patent for the so-called Murad bridge, based on the Murad pontic, a new version to the pontic used in the bridge. Usually, porcelain on metal was used but Murad came with a solution to use acrylic material on metal.

He has published many international scientific publications and researches published in pharmacy and dentistry.
He also took care of the research on the extraction of the tooth and re-planted it to its place (extraction and re-plantation) and published in Canadian and international magazines like PubMed site.

Contributions 
In 2013, Murad was awarded the Order of devotion of the first degree by the Syrian Government for his work on braces in dentistry.
His most important achievement in the world of dentistry is his invention called Murad Bridge, for which he received a patent registered with the number WO2013137835A1 and was granted the patent on December 4, 2011, The invention is a new bridge in dentistry in the name of Murad Bridge for cases of lack of bone support as a result of negligence In oral health, with the financial costs it provides for the individual and the doctor if he is faced with cases of a shortage in the number of teeth, as there is no need to increase the number of implants, but rather the new invention is used to compensate for them, which is a modified method on the traditional method based on the basic supports and in combination with the removable dentures method in addition to the invention of a laboratory method And a network to connect them, and the invention was applied to many cases, with a success rate of more than 90 percent, and it was registered internationally in Geneva. Dr. Rashad was also awarded the First Class Medal of Fidelity by the President of the Syrian Arab Republic, thus becoming the first university professor, pharmacist and dentist to receive this medal.
Dr. Rashad did not stop at scientific research. Rather, he established a medical center in Damascus in the name of advanced dental care for dental treatment and cosmetic dentistry, in which he, along with a medical cadre of his assistants, provides all medical services, the most important of which are cosmetic.
Since 2009 he has had a presence in international forums where he visited many universities around the world as a visiting doctor or lecturer, such as the University of London in Britain, the University of Zurich in Switzerland, the University of Copenhagen in Denmark, the University of Vienna in Austria, the University of Oslo in Norway, the University of California in the United States of America, the University of Rabat in Morocco, the University of Cairo in Egypt, the University of Aleppo and the University of Tishreen In Syria. He lectures in the Syrian universities of Damascus, Al-Baath, Al-Qalamoun, international universities for science and technology, and the international Syrian science and technology faculties of dentistry and pharmacy, with specializations in cosmetic dentistry - pharmacology and public health since 2003. On May 12, 2015, he was appointed by the International Council for Oral Implantology ICOI as an international president, representative Them in the Syrian Arab Republic. He was then re-elected to the same position in 2019.
He gave lectures related to the dentistry in many countries of the world, including Japan, the United States of America, Australia, Germany and many more.

Publication
•The Magnesium and Its Bioactive Effects 2021

•The Thought and Prospects of Rashad Murad 2020

•Medical and Pharmacology Ethics 2020

•Communication Skills in Medicine 2020

•The Physiological Harmony 2020

•Textbook of Ambulatory Medicine 2019

•The Modern Hematology and Immunology 2018

•The Balanced Food journey 2018

•Applied Therapeutics 2017

•Drugs Interactions 2017

•Essentials of Pharmacology for Dentistry, Arabic-English Bilingual Edition - 2016

•Prevention and management of obesity in adults – 2016

•(Pharmacology - practical) - The Ministry of Higher Education - the University of Damascus – 2016

•Pharmacodynamics – Faculty of Pharmacy – Damascus University 2016

•(Good Pharmacy Practice) – 2015

•Advisor in Dentistry Journal . Scientific, Social and Health Journal 2012 published every six months by Prof. Rashad Murad 2013- till now .

•Internal Diseases and Pharmacology Ministry of Higher Education, Aleppo University Publications, Dental Technical Institute 2012-2013 Prof. Rashad Murad Prof. Muhamad Saad Shayeb

•Pharmacology in Dentistry Damascus University Publications, Faculty of Dentistry 2012-2013 Prof. Sawsan Madi Prof. Rashad Murad

•World of Dentistry 2012 Prof. Rashad Murad

•Swan Flu, Facts and Myths 2010 Prof. Nabil Kochaji Dr. Rashad Murad
 
•Helping Guideline in Pharmacology 2004 Dr. Rashad Murad Dr. Natalia Takriti

References

1970 births
Living people